= Manavya =

Indian non-governmental organization

Manavya (which means "Humanity" in Marathi Language) is a non-governmental organization (NGO) in India, founded by Vijaya Lawate, for rehabilitating children and women affected by HIV/AIDS.
